Gillig (formerly Gillig Brothers)  is an American designer and manufacturer of buses. The company headquarters, along with its manufacturing operations, is located in Livermore, California (in the East Bay region of the San Francisco Bay Area). By volume, Gillig is the second-largest transit bus manufacturer in North America (behind New Flyer). As of 2013, Gillig had an approximate 31 percent market share of the combined United States and Canadian heavy-duty transit bus manufacturing industry, based on the number of equivalent unit deliveries.

While currently a manufacturer of transit buses, from the 1930s to the 1990s, Gillig was a manufacturer of school buses. Alongside the now-defunct Crown Coach, the company was one of the largest manufacturers of school buses on the West Coast of the United States. Gillig had been located in Hayward, California, for more than 80 years before moving to Livermore in 2017. The company was founded in San Francisco, by the Gillig brothers.

History

1890–1930 
The oldest surviving bus manufacturer in North America, Gillig was founded in 1890 as Jacob Gillig, trained in carriage building and upholstering, opened his own carriage shop in San Francisco. In 1896, his son Leo Gillig entered the business as a shop foreman, becoming a full partner in the business in 1900. The shop was destroyed as part of the 1906 San Francisco earthquake, but the Gilligs rebuilt the shop on a separate property; Chester Gillig joined the business as a bookkeeper. In 1907, Jacob Gillig died at the age of 54.

Following the earthquake, the company reopened as the Leo Gillig Automobile Works, which manufactured custom-built vehicle bodies. In 1914, two major achievements would happen to the company. After building a three-story factory, Leo and Chester Gillig re-organized the company as Gillig Brothers, its name for the next half-century. One of the first bodies built inside the new factory was one for a motor bus, though production would not shift entirely to buses for another two decades.

During the 1910s, most cars in the United States were open touring cars; at the time, fully enclosed sedan bodies were expensive. To offer improvement over the minimal weather protection, Gillig developed an add-on hardtop, patenting its own version in 1919.

The increase of closed car production in the 1920s would render the "Gillig Top" largely obsolete by 1925. While other hardtop manufacturers went out of business, Gillig survived largely on its body production, which became its primary source of revenue. In the late 1920s, the company would briefly produce pleasure boats and produce a prototype of a heavy truck; the latter would never enter production.

1930–1950 
Following the start of the Great Depression, Gillig Brothers began to look for a steady source of revenue to ensure its survival. Although the company had produced buses sporadically since 1914, in 1932, Gillig designed its first school bus body, a configuration it would produce for most of the next 60 years. In 1935, the company designed its first ambulance body; it also became the West Coast distributor of Superior Coach Company, a manufacturer of school buses and professional cars. In 1937, Gillig introduced its first flat-front (transit-style) school bus.

By 1938, demand for school buses had surpassed the capacity of the San Francisco facility, leading Gillig Brothers to move to Hayward, California, on the eastern side of San Francisco Bay.

In 1940, as a response to the Crown Supercoach, the first Gillig Transit Coach was introduced, as both a coach and school bus. The first mid-engine school bus, the Transit Coach wore an all-steel body and was powered by a Hall-Scott gasoline engine. During World War II, Gillig halted school bus production, instead producing trailer buses to transport workers in defense factories.

Following the end of the war, Gillig resumed production of the Transit Coach, introducing a rear-engine version in 1948. In 1950, the body of the Transit Coach was redesigned.

1950–1980 
In 1953, Chester Gillig retired, following the death of Leo Gillig. The management structure of the family-run company was changed, with Stanley Marx (previously in charge of sales), assuming control of Gillig. In 1957, a major acquisition was made as Gillig purchased the Pacific bus division of Washington-based truck manufacturer Kenworth. At the time, Gillig controlled a 70% market share of Northern California over Crown Coach (based in Los Angeles), along with a similar share of Washington State, Oregon, and Nevada.

In 1959, the company introduced the first rear-engine school bus with a diesel engine: the Cummins C-Series Transit Coach. Although still offered with gasoline engines in various configurations, the C-Series Transit Coach accounted for over three-quarter of all Gillig sales within only five years. In 1967, Gillig would introduce the largest school bus ever produced: the tandem-axle DT16. Along with it corresponding Crown Coach competitor, the DT16 is the only 97-passenger school bus ever produced in the United States (during 1977, its capacity was reduced to 90).

In 1978, Stanley Marx retired from Gillig, and the firm was sold to Herrick-Pacific Steel, a Hayward-based steel manufacturer. Following the sale, the company was reorganized as Gillig Corporation, its present-day name. During the acquisition and reorganization, Gillig began construction on a 117,000 square foot facility in Hayward, the largest bus manufacturing plant in the western United States.

To diversify its product line, in the mid-1970s, Gillig began plans to enter the transit bus segment.  Following the end of the "New Look" near-monopoly of GMC and Flxible, in mid-1976, Gillig entered a partnership with West German manufacturer Neoplan to build a series of European-styled transit buses. The 30-foot "Gillig-Neoplan" buses featured propane-fueled engines as an option; the partnership with Neoplan lasted until 1979.

1980–2000 
As a more permanent follow-up to the Gillig-Neoplan, the Gillig Phantom entered production in 1980. The first dedicated transit bus produced by Gillig, the Phantom would be produced from 1980 to 2008. A State of California tax-free subsidy helped early sales. Later sales were buoyed by low bids on contracts, and by specializing in serving smaller transit agencies. This strategy proved successful, as the Phantom became one of the longest-lasting transit models. In 1989, Gillig would introduce the Gillig Spirit; similar to the Gillig-Neoplan, the Spirit was a shorter, medium-duty transit bus.

After over 40 years in production, the Transit Coach ended production in 1982. After a temporary hiatus from school bus production, Gillig returned with a Phantom school bus in 1986. While initially successful, the Phantom school bus would be discontinued in 1993 following poor sales (no examples were sold in 1991 or 1992).

In 1996, following an expansion of the Hayward facility, Gillig introduced the H2000LF, its first low-floor bus. In 1997, it entered full-scale production as the Gillig Advantage. Originally designed as a rental-car shuttle bus, the Low Floor became popular as a second transit bus product line alongside the standard-floor Phantom.

2000–present 
During the 2000s, Gillig would make a number of advances with its vehicles, exploring the uses of alternative fuels and hybrid technologies in both the Low Floor and the Phantom. In 2005, the Low Floor became available in BRT and Trolley Replica body styles.

After 28 years of production, the final Gillig Phantom was produced in 2008; by the mid-2000s, high-floor buses had largely fallen out of favor with transit customers.

On August 1, 2008, Gillig became a Henry Crown company under CC Industries, Inc. CC Industries operated Gillig in the same location with the current management team.

In 2015, Gillig Corporation marked the 125th anniversary of its founding.

In May 2017, the company moved its factory from Hayward, California, to Livermore, another East Bay region city, after more than 80 years in Hayward. The move was precipitated by a need for more space, with production having outgrown the Hayward facility. Gillig plans to retain at the Hayward site a  warehouse for the sale of parts, but plans to sell the remainder of the Hayward factory, which closed on May 19, 2017. At the time of the move, the company was predicting that around 850 workers would be employed at the Livermore complex.

Alternative fuels

In 1992, Gillig began producing an LNG fueled version of the Phantom as a lower emissions option, but discontinued it in 1998. The only remaining LNG Phantoms currently operate shuttle service at Los Angeles International Airport and Dallas/Fort Worth International Airport.

In 1996, Gillig introduced a diesel-electric hybrid powered Phantom, which they produced until 2006. The current models continue to be offered in a hybrid powered versions.

In September 2011, Gillig introduced an alternative fuel BRT model with CNG propulsion—their first CNG-powered bus produced and first production natural gas buses since 1998. Long Beach Transit purchased a pilot bus in 2011, and placed an order for 63 more in 2012.

Gillig and Cummins announced a partnership to develop a battery-electric bus using Cummins technology on October 9, 2017. On May 16, 2019 the two companies unveiled a new all-electric bus. The first bus was scheduled to be delivered to Big Blue Bus (serving Santa Monica, California) in May 2020, but it was inaugurated into service on August 19, 2019.

Trolleybuses 

Though Gillig has never built a complete electric trolleybus, the company has supplied body-chassis shells for others to later equip as trolleybuses.

Between 2001 and 2002, Gillig supplied 100 Phantom body-chassis shells to King County Metro Transit. Gillig shipped these Phantom buses in fairly complete form, including interior fittings such as seats—lacking only propulsion equipment including trolleypoles. Meanwhile, transit agency removed the propulsion system (GE traction motor, Randtronics chopper control, and electronic card cage) from its old fleet of 1979-built AM General trolley coaches which the Gillig vehicles were purchased to replace, and shipped them to Alstom for refurbishment. After Alstom refurbished the propulsion system, Metro installed the equipment into the new Gillig Phantom bodies, along with Kiepe pneumatically operated fiberglass trolley poles.

Between 2014 and 2020, Kiepe partnered with Gillig to produce new dual-mode trolleybuses for the Greater Dayton Regional Transit Authority. Gillig shipped four BRTPlus body-chassis shells to Kiepe to build prototype coaches, two of which function as battery electric buses while away from electrical wires and two of which use a diesel generator. Two of these prototypes were equipped with diesel-powered generators to power the traction motors off-wire (similar to a hybrid bus) and two use batteries for off-wire operations. After successful testing, Dayton ordered 41 production battery-electric trolleys from Kiepe and Gillig.

Products

VIN
Gillig uses the following vehicle identification number (VIN) scheme:

References
Gillig, LLC, gillig.com, retrieved on 2006-12-25
Transit Coach / Pacific SchoolCoach Online Museum, gilligcoaches.net, retrieved on 2006-12-25, archived from the original at http://www.gilligcoaches.net/ archive date: 2006-12-30
Leo Gillig Automobile Works – Gillig Brothers, coachbuilt.com, retrieved on 2006-12-25
A Brief History of Hall-Scott, northern.edu, retrieved on 2006-12-26
GM Brings Clean Mass Transit to Environmental Conference, allisontransmission.com, retrieved on 2006-12-25
Stauss, Ed (1988). The Bus World Encyclopedia of Buses, Woodland Hills, CA: Stauss Publications.

Notes

External links

Gillig, LLC website

 
Motor vehicle manufacturers based in California
Hybrid electric bus manufacturers
School bus manufacturers
Companies based in Hayward, California
Vehicle manufacturing companies established in 1890
1890 establishments in California
Private equity portfolio companies
Privately held companies based in California
Companies based in Livermore, California